TSTC may mean:
Texas State Technical College System
Tri-State Transportation Campaign
TSTC Waco Airport